The Chinese Union (Traditional Chinese 福漢會 Simplified Chinese 福汉会) was an early Chinese Protestant Christian missionary society that was  involved in preaching to Chinese and sending Chinese workers to Mainland China  during the late Qing Dynasty. It was founded by Karl Gützlaff in 1844, Hong Kong. Some leaders of Taiping Rebellion was members of this society. The society disbanded after 1855.

Notes

Christian missionary societies
Christian missions in China
Religious organizations established in 1844
1844 establishments in Hong Kong
Taiping Rebellion